Patrick Forde may refer to:

Paddy Forde (1922–1972), Irish politician
Pat Forde (active since 1987), American sports journalist
Patrick Ford (boxer) (born Patrick Forde, 1955–2011), Guyanese boxer
Patrick Forde (cricketer) (1904–1945), Guyanese cricketer

See also
Patrick Ford (disambiguation)